Love or Lust is the second studio album by American band Cash Cash, released on April 19, 2011. "Victim of Love" was released as the album's first single on April 5, 2011. "Sexin' on the Dance Floor", "Naughty or Nice", and "Jersey Girl" were featured on MTV's Jersey Shore and The Real World. This was the last album to feature drummer Anthony Villacari as he left the group that year due to creative differences.

Background
Speaking about the album, lead singer Jean Paul Makhlouf said, 

The album was recorded in their home studio in Roseland, New Jersey. "Victim of Love" was released as the lead single from the album on April 5, 2011. The song peaked at number two on the iTunes Dance chart hours after its release. A remix of the song was released on April 26, 2011 and was included as a bonus track for the album. The second single, "Sexin' on the Dance Floor" was released on June 7, 2011. The album reached number two on the iTunes Dance chart.

Track listing

Personnel
Credits for Love or Lust.
 Jean Paul Makhlouf – vocals
 Alex Luke Makhlouf – keyboard, backing vocals
 Sam Frisch – guitar, bass, backing vocals
 Anthony Villacari – drums
 ADG – vocals for "Naughty or Nice" and "Sexin' on the Dance Floor"

Charts

References

External links 
Cash Cash Official Website
Band's MySpace

2011 albums
Cash Cash albums